The Suka was a unique fiddle that was played vertically, on the knee or hanging from a strap, and the strings were stopped at the side with the fingernails; similar to the Gadulka. The body of the instrument was very similar to the modern violin, but the neck was very wide, and the pegbox was crude. This was thought to be the "missing link" between the upside-down or "knee chordophone" instruments, and the modern violin. It died out, and was known only from drawings of a single specimen displayed at an exhibition in 1888.

External links
http://www.fiddlingaround.co.uk/easterneurope/Easterneurope%20frame.html

Polish musical instruments
Lost and extinct musical instruments